Nazaré is Portuguese for Nazareth. Several places have the name Nazaré:

In Brazil
Nazaré, Bahia
Nazaré (neighbourhood), in Salvador, Bahia
Nazaré, Tocantins
Nazaré Paulista, São Paulo

In Portugal

Nazaré, Portugal, a Portuguese municipality in Oeste region and Leiria District, known as a popular surfing destination because of its high breaking waves
Nazaré (TV series) a Portuguese telenovela starring Carolina Loureiro, first airing in 2019